Emil Riebeck (11 June 1853 – 22 June 1885) was a German explorer, mineralogist, ethnologist, and naturalist.  He was born in Preusslitz to Carl Adolf Riebeck, an industrial magnate.  He traveled to North Africa and Arabia several times, and in 1881 travelled with Georg Schweinfurth on an expedition to Socotra.  He traveled with Adolf Bastian to the hills of Chittagong in 1882.

In 1884, he financed Gottlob Krause’s expedition to the Niger River, Benue River, and Lake Chad.

Riebeck amassed an extensive collection of artifacts from Eastern Asia, India, Arabia and Africa.

The mineral riebeckite is named after him.

Also, a species of Socotran lizard, Haemodracon riebeckii, is named in his honor.

References

External links
 Emil Riebeck
 Sonderausstellung der Riebecksammlung im Kunstgewerbemusseum Berlin 1883/1884
Kurzporträit

Literature
Otto Taschenberg: Beiträge zur Fauna der Insel Sokotra, vorzüglich nach dem von Herrn Dr. Emil Riebeck aus Halle a.S. gesammelten Materiale zusammengestellt von Dr. O. Taschenberg in Halle a.S., in: Zeitschrift für Naturwissenschaft, Leipzig 1883 *Emil Riebeck: Die Hügelstämme von Chittagong. Berlin 1885.

1853 births
1885 deaths
People from Bernburg
German explorers
German mineralogists
German ethnologists
German explorers of Africa
Explorers of Asia
Explorers of Arabia